The Chevrolet Volt is a plug-in hybrid manufactured by General Motors, also marketed in rebadged variants as the Holden Volt in Australia and New Zealand and the Buick Velite 5 in China, and with a different fascia as the Vauxhall Ampera in the United Kingdom and as the Opel Ampera in the remainder of Europe. Volt production ended in February 2019.

Sales of the 2011 Volt began in the United States in mid-December 2010, followed by various European countries and other international markets in 2011. Global combined Volt/Ampera-family sales totaled about 177,000 units by the end of October 2018. The U.S. is the leading market, with 157,054 Volts delivered through the end of 2019, followed by Canada with 16,653 Volts sold through September 2018. Just over 10,000 Opel/Vauxhall Ampera cars had been sold in Europe . Until December 2018, the Volt/Ampera family of vehicles was the world's all-time bestselling plug-in hybrid vehicle. , the Chevrolet Volt is listed as the all-time top-selling plug-in hybrid in the American market.

The Volt operates as a pure battery electric vehicle until its battery capacity drops to a predetermined threshold from full charge. From there, its internal combustion engine powers an electric generator to extend the vehicle's range as needed. While running on gasoline at high speeds the engine may be mechanically linked (by a clutch) to a generator set, improving efficiency by 10% to 15%. The Volt's regenerative braking also contributes to the on-board electricity generation.

Deliveries to retail customers in the U.S. and Canada began in October 2015 as a 2016 model year.

The Volt has won several awards, including the 2009 Green Car Vision Award, 2011 Green Car of the Year, 2011 North American Car of the Year, 2011 World Green Car, 2012 European Car of the Year, and 2016 Green Car of the Year.

Terminology 

The Society of Automotive Engineers' (SAE) definition of a hybrid vehicle states that the vehicle shall have "two or more energy storage systems both of which must provide propulsion power, either together or independently." General Motors has avoided the use of the term "hybrid" when describing its Voltec designs, even after the carmaker revealed that in some cases the combustion engine provided some assist at very high speeds. This contribution from the gas engine is only at high speeds. Normal driving there is no contribution and the car runs all electric. Instead General Motors describes the Volt as an electric vehicle equipped with a "range extending" gasoline-powered internal combustion engine (ICE) as a genset and therefore dubbed the Volt an "Extended Range Electric Vehicle" or E-REV. In a January 2011 interview, the Chevy Volt's Global Chief Engineer, Pamela Fletcher, referred to the Volt as "an electric car with extended range."

According to the Society of Automotive Engineers (SAE) definitions, the Volt is a plug-in hybrid vehicle due to the combination of an internal combustion engine and two electric motors, along with a battery that can accept off-board energy. As a plug-in hybrid, the Volt can operate as a purely electric vehicle for the first  in charge-depleting mode. When the battery capacity drops below a pre-established threshold from full charge the vehicle enters charge-sustaining mode, and the Volt's control system selects the most efficient combination of two electric motors, one powered by the propulsion system battery pack reserve and one by the combustion generator, to improve performance and boost high-speed efficiency.

History

Concept vehicle 
The Chevrolet Volt concept car debuted at the January 2007 North American International Auto Show, becoming the first-ever series plug-in hybrid concept car shown by a major car manufacturer. The Volt concept vehicle had four doors with a rear liftgate and seating for four passengers. This was a significant change in design when compared to the General Motors EV1 of the 1990s, which only seated two to reduce weight and to make the necessary room for the lead-acid battery pack.

General Motors' then-Vice-Chairman for global product development Robert Lutz was looking for a "Prius fighter", a leapfrog product like Apple's iPod. The two-seater sports car being developed by Tesla, the Tesla Roadster (2008), and the rapid advancement of lithium-ion battery technology inspired him to push the carmaker to develop the Volt after the 2006 Detroit Auto Show, overcoming internal opposition that recalled losing a billion dollars in the 1990s over the EV1 electric vehicle program. Lutz's initial idea was to develop an all-electric car, but Jon Lauckner, General Motors Vice President for global program management, quickly sketched out the powertrain layout, estimated the vehicle weight and  battery requirements, convinced Lutz that to avoid an expensive battery, range anxiety concerns, and lack of public charging infrastructure, they could use a smaller battery pack with a small combustion engine driving a generator acting as a backup to extend the range, but without a mechanical connection between the gasoline engine and the drive wheels, so it would be a pure electrically driven vehicle without many of the limitations General Motors learned from the EV1 experience.

Most of the Volt initial design parameters defined for the development of the concept car, then referred as the "iCar" in homage to the iPod, were kept throughout the process up to the final production version. This target range lets drivers make most travel electrically driven, with the assumption that charging takes place at home overnight. This requirement translated to using a lithium-ion battery pack with an energy storage capacity of 16 considering that the battery would be used until the state of charge (SoC) of the battery reached 30%. This limit to the SOC was necessary in order to maintain operational performance under a wide range of environments, and to minimize the battery degradation to allow at least a ten-year life span.

Another key design decision was to develop the concept car based on a new family of common powertrain components for electric propulsion, which initially was called the E-Flex Systems, "E" stands for electric drive and "Flex" for the different sources of electricity, but later was renamed Voltec drive system. The E-Flex or Voltec powertrain is an attempt to standardize many components of possible future electrically propelled vehicles, and to allow multiple interchangeable electricity-generating systems. The E-Flex powertrain has the potential to adapt the vehicles to pure battery electric, to fuel cell-powered or to several other sources of energy to create electricity on board, such as engine-generator sets (genset) fueled by gasoline, diesel, biodiesel, ethanol fuel (E100), or flex-fuel (E85). Regenerative braking would also contribute to the on-board electricity generation. In October 2006 the E-flex powertrain was selected for the new propulsion architecture and the name Volt was chosen by General Motors.

The Volt concept car became the first application of the E-Flex (Voltec) drive system with a combination of an electric motor, the same used in the Chevrolet Equinox Fuel Cell, a  lithium-ion battery pack with 136kW of peak power, and a genset consisting of a small 1.0L, 3-cylinder turbocharged flex-fuel capable engine linked to a  generator. General Motors called this genset an electric vehicle (EV) range extender. The vehicle was propelled by an electric motor with a peak output of  delivering  of motoring torque. 

General Motors also emphasized that the Volt would further reduce dependence on imported oil if E85 ethanol was used instead of gasoline to power the on-board generator engine. Robert Lutz added that if the driver used E85, "the fuel economy figure became 525 miles per (equivalent) petroleum gallon", as only 15% of gasoline is used in this blend. General Motors also noted that actual production of the Volt depended on further battery development, because the required rechargeable batteries needed to make the Volt a viable vehicle did not exist in the market and had yet to be developed. The concept car was actually powered by two 12-volt conventional car batteries, just enough power to allow the vehicle to move at low speeds in the stand.

Lutz initially said the Volt was expected to sell around $30,000, based on the cost of a conventional car of that size with a conventional four-cylinder engine plus US$8,000 for the lithium battery. Developers faced cost escalation as they found out the Volt could not share components from GM's compact car platform like power steering, power brake, air-conditioning compressor that were driven by a belt running off the engine, in addition to the cost of a compact  electric motor and specialized microprocessors to control energy flow to the motor, GM eventually decided to price the Volt at a base price from around US$40,000. The US$1 billion cost to develop the Volt is equivalent to creating three vehicles on an existing platform.

First generation (2010–2015)

Production model 

The production design model officially unveiled on September 16, 2008, as part of General Motors (GM) centennial celebration at the Wintergarden headquarters in Detroit. The production model differed greatly in design from the original concept car. Another reason was the use of General Motors's new global compact vehicle platform Delta II to keep costs reasonable, and shared with the 2010 model year Chevrolet Cruze. Another significant difference from the concept car is the seating, as the production Volt seats four rather than five passengers. This change was due to the higher-than-usual central tunnel that runs from the front console to the rear seat that houses the car's T-shaped battery pack.

After the concept was put into the pipeline for production, GM began looking for a partner to develop the Volt's lithium-ion battery pack. The carmaker evaluated about 25 battery cell chemistries and constructions from around two dozen lithium-ion battery makers around the world. Due to their more promising cell technologies, two companies were selected in June 2007, Compact Power (CPI), which uses a lithium manganese oxide (LiMn2O4) cell made by its parent company, LG Chemical; and Continental Automotive Systems, which uses lithium iron phosphate based cylindrical cells made by A123Systems. By the end of October 2007 CPI (LG Chem) delivered their finished battery pack prototypes, and A123 delivered theirs by January 2008. GM's testing process was conducted at the laboratory the carmaker had created for the GM EV1 program. The battery packs included monitoring systems designed to keep the batteries cool and operating at optimum capacity despite a wide range of ambient temperatures. To ensure the battery pack would last 10 years and  expected for the battery warranty, the Volt team decided to use only half of the 16  capacity to reduce the rate of capacity degradation, limiting the state of charge (SOC) up to 80% of capacity and never depleting the battery below 30%. GM also expected the battery to withstand 5,000 full discharges without losing more than 10% of its charge capacity. According to GM, no batteries had been changed due to degradation.

In April 2008 GM started extensive battery testing. In two years, the carmaker put the battery packs to the equivalent of 150,000 real-world miles (240,000 km) and 10 years of use. In April 2008 the lithium-ion battery pack was placed in Chevrolet Malibus fitted with the Volt powertrain to be used as test mules for further real-world testing. In October 2008, GM chose CPI (LG Chemical) to provide the battery systems for the first production version of the Volt. In July 2008, GM confirmed that a non-turbocharged, 1.4 L 4-cylinder engine would be used as the range extender, and that the intention was to build it in Flint, Michigan. In April 2009, General Motors let journalists test the Volt powertrain without the range-extending generator in the body of Chevrolet Cruze sedans that GM used as test mules at the GM Technical Center in Warren, Michigan.

The first pre-production test car based on the final Volt design was built in June 2009, in Warren, Michigan, and by October 2009, 80 Volts had been built and were tested under various conditions. On March 31, 2010, the first factory-built Volt was produced at the Detroit Hamtramck Assembly Plant to test the production line and for quality control purposes, both of the tooling and the pre-production vehicles produced before regular production began.

Tony Posawatz was the Volt Vehicle Line Director from 2006 to 2012, and he was known as employee #1 and led the team from concept to production.

Official introduction
General Motors held a ceremony at its Detroit Hamtramck Assembly Plant on November 30, 2010, to introduce the first Chevrolet Volt off the assembly line. The first Volt built for retail sale was earmarked for display at GM's Heritage Center museum in Sterling Heights, Michigan. The proceeds went to fund mathematics and sciences education in Detroit through the Detroit Public Schools Foundation. Deliveries to retail customers in the United States began in mid December 2010. Volt deliveries began in Canada in September 2011. The first deliveries of the Chevrolet Volt in Europe took place in November 2011. The European version of the Volt, the Opel Ampera, was released to retail customers in Europe in February 2012. Deliveries of the right-hand drive Vauxhall Ampera in the UK began in May 2012. The Holden Volt was released in Australia in December 2012.

Specifications

Drivetrain 

The 2011 Chevrolet Volt has a  / 45 A·h ( usable) lithium-ion battery pack that can be charged by plugging the car into a 120–240 VAC residential electrical outlet using the provided SAE J1772-compliant charging cord. No external charging station is required. The Volt is propelled by an electric motor with a peak output of  delivering  of torque. Other specifications remained the same. This incremental upgrade is likely to reflect in an improvement in range over previous model years, but , the 2015 Volt has not been re-certified with the EPA.

The vehicle also has a regenerative braking system. The electrical power from the generator is sent primarily to the electric motor, with the excess going to the batteries, depending on the state of charge (SOC) of the battery pack and the power demanded at the wheels.

Prior to the 2016 model year, the Volt required premium gasoline of (R+M)/2 octane rating of 91 or higher because the higher octane permitted the 10.5:1 compression ratio engine to use more ignition timing advance to maximize fuel efficiency by 5 to 10% compared to regular gasoline. For users who drive mostly in electric mode, and to avoid maintenance problems caused by storing the same gasoline in the tank for months, the 2011 Volt has a sealed and pressurized fuel tank to avoid evaporation. As a result, the fuel filler must be depressurized before opening the tank. Also, the engine management system monitors the time since the engine last ran, and prompts the driver to run past the  all-electric range before recharging to consume some gasoline. If the driver does not run on gasoline, the system automatically runs the maintenance mode, which starts the engine to consume some of the aging fuel and circulate fluids within the engine. A configuration with an E85 flex-fuel capable engine is under development and was expected to be available in 2013.

Operating and driving modes
The Voltec drivetrain has three power converting elements:
 Primary traction electric motor/generator, provides good acceleration for driving at lower speeds and regeneration for braking, its maximum output of 111 kW setting the maximum output of the whole system.
 Secondary electric motor/generator, works primarily as generator capable of producing 55 kW or when necessary acts as a motor assisting the primary electric motor.
 Internal combustion engine of 63 kW power, engaged when the batteries reach the predetermined threshold.

These units are connected via a planetary gear and three electrically controlled hydraulic clutches to provide power output for propulsion in any of four programmed operating modes:

 Single-motor electric – The primary motor runs solely on battery power, maximum propulsion power is 111 kW.
 Dual-motor electric – At higher vehicle speeds the secondary motor engages over the planetary gear such that it reduces the speed of the primary motor. This facilitates higher efficiency and better mileage for the combined system, without increasing the maximum power.
 Single-motor extended – The battery reaches its minimum charge, which triggers the combustion engine. The engine drives the secondary motor as a generator, via the charging electronics, to keep the minimum battery charge level. The primary motor can still provide its 111 kW for short acceleration, albeit not sustained.
 Dual-motor extended – The electric motors are used again in dual configuration with increased efficiency at higher speeds. Additionally, the gasoline engine contributes propulsion power via the planetary gear. While power is drained from the battery the amount is less than in mode 2 for the same propulsion power, thus extending the range.

The drivetrain permits the Volt to operate as a pure battery electric vehicle until its battery capacity has been depleted to a defined level, at which time it commences to operate as a series hybrid design where the gasoline engine drives the generator, which keeps the battery at minimum level charge and provides power to the electric motors. The full charge of the battery is replenished only by loading it on the electrical grid. While in this series mode at higher speeds and loads, (typically above  at light to moderate loads) the gasoline engine can engage mechanically to the output from the transmission and assist both electric motors in driving the wheels, in which case the Volt operates as a power-split or series-parallel hybrid.

While operating modes are switched automatically the Volt allows the driver to choose from three drive modes: normal, sport and mountain. The mountain mode, which is expected to be required only under unusual power demand conditions, increases minimum battery state of charge (SOC) to around 45%, thus maintaining performance on steep and long grades. The driver hears more engine noise due to the higher rate of power generation required to maintain this mode. The sport mode causes the engine to rev higher, and the response to the throttle pedal is quicker. The Ampera has an additional option, the "City Mode" or "battery hold", allowing the driver to save the energy currently stored in the battery for use when traveling in urban areas or restricted zones. The 2013 model year Volt includes a "Hold" option to provide the same choice.

Battery 

The 2011 Volt's lithium-ion battery (Li-ion) battery pack weighs  and "consists of 288 individual cells arranged into nine modules. Plastic frames hold pairs of lithium-ion cells that sandwich an aluminum cooling fin. The design and construction of that aluminum plate was critical to ensuring an even temperature distribution with no hot or cool spots across the flat, rectangular cell. The battery pack has its own cooling circuit that is similar to, but independent from, the engine cooling system."

For the 2011/2012 model years, the battery pack stores 16kWh of energy but it is controlled or buffered via the energy management system to use only 10.3kWh of this capacity to maximize the life of the pack. For this reason the battery pack never fully charges or depletes, as the software only allows the battery to operate within a state of charge (SoC) window of 65%, after which the engine kicks in and maintains the charge near the lower level. The minimum SoC varies depending on operating conditions. When the car needs more power, such as in mountain mode, the lower limit of the SoC rises to 45% to ensure enough power is available. The battery capacity was increased to 16.5kWh for the 2013 model year, the SOC window was increased to use 10.8kWh of the total battery energy, and the buffer to ensure battery life is not reduced. These changes increases the Volt's all-electric range, but charging takes slightly longer. GM achieved the improved battery performance and durability through minor changes to the material composition of the battery cell chemistry.

Despite containing near identical energy (±0.5kWh), the Volt's battery pack is over 70% lighter than the EV1's original  16.5kWh AC Delco lead-acid battery pack, mainly because the Volt uses higher specific energy Li-ion batteries. Li-ion batteries are expected to become less expensive as economies of scale take effect.

Because batteries are sensitive to temperature changes, the Volt has a thermal management system to monitor and maintain the battery cell temperature for optimum performance and durability. The Volt features a battery pack that can be both warmed or cooled. In cold weather, the car electrically heats the battery coolant during charging or operation to provide full power capability. In hot weather, the car can use its air conditioner to cool the battery coolant to prevent over-temperature damage.

GM estimates that Volt batteries will degrade by 1030% after 8 years or 100,000 miles. GM has applied for a patent that may allow technicians to quickly and cheaply recover some of the performance of degraded battery packs. The Volt's battery management system runs more than 500 diagnostics at 10 times per second, allowing it to keep track of the Volt's battery pack in real-time, 85% of which ensure the battery pack is operating safely and 15% monitor battery performance and life.

The Volt uses the J1772 charging plug, a standard connector for electric cars in North America. Depending on in-car settings, a full charge takes from approximately 10 hours (with the 12A setting) to as much as 14 hours (8A setting) from a standard North American 120V receptacle. From a 240V source, a full charge takes around 4 hours. The Volt comes with a  charging cord suitable for the standard household power outlet in its country of sale. If plugged in, recharging can be controlled remotely through a smartphone application.

Others 
To save energy, the Volt sometimes heats the seats instead of blowing heated air through HVAC system, as heating the vehicle's cabin draws significant power, and can even exceed what is needed to move the vehicle on occasions. A power-saving stereo system uses amplifiers that switch on and off rapidly to save power. It uses 50 percent less energy. The system is also lighter because the use of high grade neodymium magnets.

Performance 
According to Edmunds.com road tests, the Volt's 0 to 60 mph  acceleration time is 9.2 seconds running on electric-only mode, and 9.0 seconds with the gasoline engine assisting propulsion.

Range 

According to General Motors the Volt's all-electric range with fully charged batteries varies from  depending on terrain, driving technique, and temperature.

The 2014 and 2015 Volt have the same EPA ratings.

Fuel economy 
United States

The U.S. Environmental Protection Agency (EPA) officially rated the 2011 model year Volt's combined city/highway fuel economy in all-electric mode at 93 miles per gallon gasoline equivalent (MPG-e) (2.5 L gasoline equivalent/100 km; 112 mpg-imp gasoline equivalent) and 94 MPG-e for the 2012 model year.

For the 2012 model year, EPA revised the Volt's fuel economy ratings, increasing the combined city/highway rating in all-electric mode from 93 MPG-e to 94 MPG-e, and the highway rating was increased from 90 MPG-e to 93 MPG-e. As a result of its improved battery pack, the 2013 model year EPA rating climbed to a combined city/highway fuel economy of 98 miles per gallon gasoline equivalent (2.4 L gasoline equivalent/100 km; 118 mpg-imp gasoline equivalent).

Europe
The Opel Ampera official equivalent fuel consumption under the EU-approved UN ECE R101 standard for plug-in hybrids is  (83.3 km/L). However, a leading Opel engineer prefers saying 169 Wh/km (16.9 kWh/100 km) while battery-powered, and then 20 km/L (5 L/100 km) petrol-powered. The ECE R101 standard weights charge-depleting mode as 76% and gasoline-only driving as 24%.

Operating cost and payback period
According to Consumer Reports in December 2011, the Chevrolet Volt fuel cost in electric mode was 3.8¢/mile.

According to Edmunds.com, the price premium paid for the Volt in 2012, after discounting the  U.S. federal tax credit, takes a long time for consumers to recover in fuel savings, often longer than the normal ownership time period.

Tailpipe emissions

Safety 

The Volt received a five-star overall crash safety rating from the National Highway Traffic Safety Administration (NHTSA), the highest possible score. This rating was obtained with NHTSA's New Car Assessment Program for 2011 model year vehicles.

Accident and rescue handling
In August 2010, General Motors began a training program for first responders when performing rescue duties involving the Chevrolet Volt.

Warning sounds
Due to significant noise reduction typical of vehicles traveling in all-electric mode at low speeds, the Volt is fitted with a manually activated electronic warning sound system called Pedestrian-Friendly Alert System for use when the car is operating at low speeds to alert pedestrians to the car's presence.

Second generation (2016–2019)

The second generation Chevrolet Volt was officially unveiled at the January 2015 North American International Auto Show. Retail deliveries began in the United States and Canada in October 2015 as a 2016 model year, with 1,324 units delivered in the U.S. that month. Availability in the American market was limited to California and the other 10 states that follow California's zero emission vehicle regulations. GM scheduled the second generation as a 2017 model year to be released in the 39 remaining states by early 2016. Manufacturing of the 2017 MY Volt began in February 2016, and the first units arrived at dealerships at the end of February 2016. The 2017 model complies with stricter Tier 3 emissions requirements and was available nationwide.

The second generation Volt has an upgraded powertrain with a 1.5-liter engine that uses regular gasoline; the 18.4 kWh battery pack has new chemistry that stores 20% more electrical energy and uses fewer cells, 192 compared with 288 on the 2014 Volt; it uses a new power controller that is integrated with the motor housing; the electric motors weigh  less and use smaller amounts of rare earth metals. GM engineers explained that the second generation Volt was developed using extensive input from Volt owners.

These improvements allow the 2016 Volt to deliver better EPA ratings than the first generation model. The official second generation Volt's rating for combined city/highway fuel economy in all-electric mode is 106 miles per gallon gasoline equivalent (MPGe; 2.2Le/100km), up from 98MPGe (2.4Le/100km) for the 2015 first generation model. The combined gasoline-electricity fuel economy rating of the 2016 model year Volt is  equivalent, 82MPGe (2.9Le/100km) in city driving and 72MPGe (3.3Le/100km) in highway. Both the all-electric range and fuel economy ratings are the same for the 2017 model year Volt.

The 2016 Volt pricing started at  before any government incentives, plus  for destination. The starting price was  lower than the 2015 Volt. In California, order books for the second generation Volt were opened on May 28, 2015.

In July 2014, Opel announced that due to the slowdown in sales, they would discontinue the Ampera after the launch of the second generation Volt—and that between 2014 and 2018, Opel planned to introduce a successor electric vehicle in Europe. General Motors announced in February 2016 that the all-electric Opel Ampera-e hatchback would go into production in 2017. This is the European version of the Chevrolet Bolt EV.

In April 2015, General Motors confirmed that it would not build the second-generation Volt in right-hand-drive configuration. Due to low sales, only 246 units had been sold in Australia by mid-April 2015, and they discontinued the Holden Volt once they sold the remaining stock.

Notes:
1. The EPA run tests used a reproducible methodology to produce results that can be compared between vehicles and test sites.

Production, price and sales

North America 
Assembly of the Volt was assigned to Detroit/Hamtramck Assembly plant following the UAWGM conclusion of the 2007 contract talks. For initial production the gasoline engine is being imported from the Opel engine plant in Aspern, Austria. In November 2010, General Motors began investing  million at its engine operations plant in Flint, Michigan, to support increased production of the Ecotec 1.4 L engine that is used in the Chevrolet Cruze, the upcoming 2012 Chevrolet Sonic, and the variant used in the Chevrolet Volt. The Flint plant was expected to start production of 400 engines a day in early 2011, ramp up daily production to 800 engines in late 2011, and to increase its capacity to 1,200 a day by late 2012. In May 2011, General Motors decided to invest an additional  at the Flint plant to further increase 1.4 L engine production capacity.

In 2010, General Motors planned an initial production for calendar year 2011 of 10,000 Volts and 45,000 units for 2012, up from the 30,000 units initially announced. In May 2011, the carmaker again raised its production targets, as Volt and Ampera production capacity was increased to 16,000 units in 2011, including 3,500 units for exports and 2,500 demonstration units destined to U.S. dealerships, and the rest for U.S. sales. However, in November 2011 GM's sales chief announced that they would not meet its sales goal of 10,000 vehicles in 2011.

Out of the 2012 production, General Motors expected to produce 10,000 Amperas for sale in Europe, 6,000 destined for Opel and 4,000 for Vauxhall in the UK. In addition, 2,000 Volts were available for the region. By early 2012 GM abandoned its sales target to deliver 45,000 Volts in the U.S and instead announced that production in 2012 would depend on demand. By March 2012 the Volt plant has a global production capacity of 60,000 vehicles per year.

The Volt's battery cells are produced by LG Chem in South Korea and then shipped to the US, where the battery packs are assembled at a purpose-built facility in Brownstown Charter Township, Michigan, owned and operated by General Motors. Compact Power, the North American subsidiary of LG Chem, is building a battery plant in Holland, Michigan, to manufacture the advanced battery cells for the Volt and other carmakers, with capacity to produce enough cells for 50,000 to 200,000 battery packs per year. The  million Holland plant was funded by 50% U.S. Department of Energy matching stimulus funds and is planned to open by mid-2012.

The 2011 Chevrolet Volt was officially launched on November 30, 2010, at a ceremony at the Hamtramck plant, where the first production unit for retail sale came off the assembly line. The first retail vehicle was delivered to a customer in Denville, New Jersey, on December 15, 2010. GM reported it had built 12,400 Volts in total through December 2011. This includes dealers' demo vehicles in North America and Amperas in dealerships in Europe, crash test vehicles and other unavailable Volts owned by GM.

GM halted production for about one month at the Detroit/Hamtramck Assembly plant by mid June 2011 to complete some upgrades, including the installation of new tooling, equipment and overhead conveyor systems throughout the facility. These upgrades allowed GM to triple the rate of Volt production and prepared the plant for 2012 Volt and Ampera production. After the plant retooling, the production rate reached 150 units per day four days a week by August 2011. The Volt plant was also down during January 2012 in preparation for building the California lower-emission version. A four-week shutdown due to slow sales took place between March and April 2012. GM said it had around 3,600 Volts in inventory and needed to reduce dealer inventories as production is expected to meet market demand. GM also extended the traditional two-week summer vacation by an extra week at the Hamtramck plant. GM closed its Detroit-Hamtramck plant from September 17 until October 15, 2012, affecting roughly 1,500 workers on downtime while the plant was retooled to assemble the all-new 2014 Chevrolet Impala alongside the 2013 Volt. This was the second time in 2012 that GM has halted Volt production.

Production of the 2013 model year Volt began in July 2012 and customer deliveries began during the same month. In October 2012, GM announced they would build the Cadillac ELR extended-range luxury coupe at the Detroit-Hamtramck Assembly plant, together with the Chevrolet Volt, Opel Ampera, and Holden Volt. The addition of the ELR to the plant represents an additional  million investment, bringing the total product investment to  million since December 2009. The first 2014 ELRs rolled off the production line in late May 2013. These were pre-production units destined for testing purposes before production for retail customers began at the end of 2013. Deliveries of the 2014 model year Volt began in August 2013. Volt sales in the U.S. reached the 50,000 unit milestone in October 2013, out of more than 60,000 vehicles of the Volt/Ampera family sold worldwide. Production of the 2015 model year Volt ended in mid-May 2015, while manufacturing of pre-production units of the second generation began in March 2015. In July 2016, Volt sales in the American market passed the 100,000 unit milestone, out of about 117,000 Volt/Ampera family vehicles sold worldwide through June 2016. Volt production ended  on February 19, 2019. The final Volt that rolled off the assembly line went to the GM Heritage Center in Sterling Heights, Michigan.

United States 

Sales of the 2011 Chevrolet Volt began in selected markets due to limited initial production, as General Motors' original target for 2011 was 10,000 units. The first cars were delivered in Washington D.C., the New York City metropolitan region, California, and Austin, Texas. By May 2011 the Volt had been launched also in Connecticut, Maryland, Michigan, New Jersey, and Virginia. Deliveries in Delaware, Florida, Georgia, Hawaii, North Carolina, Oregon, Pennsylvania, South Carolina, and Washington began in the third quarter of 2011. In June 2011, Chevrolet dealers nationwide began taking orders for the 2012 Volt, and deliveries in all 50 states began in November 2011.

That price excluded destination freight charge, tax, title, license, dealer fees, optional equipment—and savings due to factory incentives, tax deductions, or other subsidies for qualifying buyers. The MSRP for the 2012 Volt starts at  including a  destination freight charge and excludes tax, title and license fees, or other available government subsidies. The base price is  less than the 2011 model year, and General Motors explained that this price reduction was possible because of a "wider range of options and configurations that come with the expansion of Volt production for sale nationally." The price dropped to  including destination charges for the 2014 model year.

Due to the capacity of the Volt's battery pack it qualifies for the maximum  federal tax credit as specified in the Emergency Economic Stabilization Act of 2008. The federal tax credit phases out over a one-year period after the manufacturer has sold at least 200,000 vehicles in the U.S. Several states also have additional incentives or rebates available for plug-in electric vehicles for qualifying buyers. For the 2012 model year the price of the Volt with all available options is  before tax credits or any subsidies available. , General Motors combined sales of plug-in electric vehicles in the U.S. totaled almost 197,000 units and are expected to pass 200,000 early in 2019. Thereafter, the applicable tax credit reduces gradually until it is completely phased out beginning on January 1, 2020.

The price for the home charging units is  plus installation costs. The Voltec is a home-charging unit built by SPX for Volt owners. It is a 240V AC charger, and, according to General Motors, can replenish the Volt's batteries in about four hours. Early buyers can benefit from the federal tax credit available for charging equipment.

The 2011 Volt was not submitted for application to the California Air Resources Board's (CARB) Clean Vehicle Rebate Project rebate and therefore was not required to meet the 10-year  battery warranty requirement for enhanced advanced technology partial zero-emissions vehicles (enhAT-PZEV). The Volt team explained that for the launch General Motors decided to go with a common national package that includes an 8-year  battery warranty. For this reason owners of the 2011 Volt did not qualify for California's rebates and free access to use carpool lanes even when traveling solo. A third package, scheduled for 2013, is under development with an E85 flex-fuel engine. General Motors engineering team commented that "introducing two or three packages of an entirely new technology set and platform at the same time wasn't an option."

In February 2012 General Motors began deliveries of a low emission version destined for California that features a new low emissions package that allows the 2012 Chevrolet Volt to qualify as an enhanced, advanced technology –partial zero emissions vehicle (enhAT-PZEV) and have access to California's high-occupancy vehicle lanes (HOV). The new standard California version of the Volt features a modified engine and exhaust components. The catalytic converter was modified to add a secondary air-injection pump that "streams ambient air into the exhaust stream to increase its ability to remove pollutants." Owners of a 2012 Volt with the low emissions package are eligible to apply for one of 40,000 available HOV lane stickers issued to vehicles that qualify as a California AT-PZEV. The permits are handed out on a first-apply, first-served basis. This incentive is in addition to the federal government's  tax credit. Only the 2012 Volts manufactured after February 6, 2012, are fitted with the low emission package and sold as standard models in California. Other states where the Volt has solo driving access to HOV lanes are Florida, Georgia, New York and Virginia.

When introduced in December 2010, the 2011 Volt was the most fuel efficient car sold in the American market in the compact class, with a combined gasoline-electricity fuel economy of  equivalent (MPG-e), until it was surpassed by the 2012 Ford Focus Electric in February 2012. Nevertheless, the Volt remained as the most fuel efficient car with an internal combustion engine available in the United States until May 2014, when the BMW i3 REx replaced the Volt as the most efficient EPA-certified current year vehicle with a gasoline engine, with a combined gasoline-electricity fuel economy of  equivalent (MPG-e).

In early October 2014, based on General Motors' real time tally of miles driven by Volt owners in North America, the company reported they have accumulated a total of 1 billion miles (1.6 billion km) traveled, of which, about 62.5% were driven in all-electric mode. A similar report, issued by GM in August 2016, reported that Volt owners have accumulated almost 1.5 billion miles (2.4 billion km) driven in EV mode, representing 60% of their total miles traveled.

The 2015 edition of the EPA's annual report "Light-Duty Automotive Technology, Carbon Dioxide Emissions, and Fuel Economy Trends" estimates the following utility factors for 2015 model year plug-in hybrids to represent the percentage of miles that will be driven using electricity by an average driver, whether in electric only or blended modes, The Volt has a utility factor of 66%, compared with 83% for the BMW i3 REx, 45% for the Ford Energi models, 43% for the McLaren P1, 37% for the BMW i8, and 29% for the Toyota Prius PHV.

U.S. sales 
Since sales began in December 2010, a total of 157,054 Volts have been sold in the country through December 2019. The Volt listed as the all-time top selling plug-in electric car in the United States until February 2015, when it was surpassed by the all-electric Nissan Leaf in March 2015. Cumulative Volt sales passed Leaf sales in March 2016, and became once again the best selling plug-in car in the U.S. ever. In July 2016, Volt sales in the American market passed the 100,000 unit milestone.

In December 2018 the Volt still ranked as the all-time best selling plug-in electric car in the United States, but by February 2019 it was surpassed by the all-electric Tesla Model 3. , the Volt ranked as the top selling plug-in hybrid in the American market ever, and also as the third all-time best selling plug-in car after the Tesla Model 3 (~300,000) and the Model S (~158,000).

Resale value 

In May 2011 Kelley Blue Book (KBB) projected the 2011 Chevrolet Volt resale value at just over  after 36 months, the length of a typical lease, which represents 42% of the car's  suggested retail price (MSRP). In comparison, KBB notes, the 2011 Toyota Prius has a projected residual of 46% after 36 months. For 2012, Kelley Blue Book expected the Volt to retain 42% of its original value after 3 years and 27% after 5 years. Based on these figures, in November 2011 KBB awarded the Volt with the 2012 Best Resale Value Awards in the plug-in electric car category. KBB explains that the residual value for the Volt is lower than the market 35.5% average due to the  federal tax credit, which lowers the transaction price and pushes down the residual value.

Consumer Reports' analysis show that many Chevrolets lose about half of their purchase price after three years of ownership, and if the Volt depreciates the same,  seems a reasonable estimate. However, Consumer Reports have noted that fuel-efficient hybrids and diesel models often depreciate far less than most vehicles, which might increase the Volt's resale value after three years above the  estimate. Additionally, if gasoline prices continue to rise or if the tax credits expire, the demand for used Chevrolet Volts could quickly increase, raising their market value. On the other hand, if the next-generation Volt's battery has twice the capacity and cost less, as General Motors has claimed, the first generation Volts would be obsolete when the new ones come out in 2015. Considering these assumptions, Consumer Reports said, "At this point we believe it's still unclear how the Volt will fare."

Pecan Street demonstration project 
General Motors is sponsoring the Pecan Street demonstration project at the Mueller neighborhood in Austin, Texas. The project objective is to learn the charging patterns of plug-in electric car owners, and to study how a residential fleet of electric vehicles might strain the electric grid if all owners try to charge them at the same, which is what the preliminary monitoring found when the plug-in cars return home in the evening. , the community has nearly 60 Chevrolet Volt owners alone thanks to GM's commitment to match the federal government's  rebate incentive, which halves the purchase price of the Volt.

Canada 

Chevrolet began taking orders in May 2011 and deliveries began in September 2011 in major cities only. During 2012 the Volt was the best selling plug-in car in Canada, outselling all other PEVs combined. Despite a 24% reduction from 2012 sales, the Volt continued as the top selling PEV in the Canadian market in 2013, and again in 2014. , the Volt continued to rank as the all-time top selling plug-in electric car in Canada. Since September 2011, a total of 16,653 new Volts have been delivered in Canada through the end of October 2018. The monthly sales record was set in May 2018 with 731 deliveries. Sales in 2016 set a calendar year record of 3,469 units delivered.

This excludes any charges, fees, and optional equipment—and is before any available subsidies or incentives for qualifying buyers. The Canadian market offers the Volt in one standard trim level with two option packages: Premium Trim Package and Rear Camera and Park Assist Package. Some provinces are offering Government incentives including Ontario, Quebec (both at  ) and British Columbia has announced their new LiveSmart BC program in which the Chevrolet Volt qualifies for a  incentive/rebate as well as  towards charging equipment.

Opel Ampera (Europe) 

The European version of the Volt, the Opel Ampera (known as the Vauxhall Ampera in the United Kingdom), was unveiled at the Geneva Auto Show in March 2009 and also was exhibited at the 2009 Frankfurt Auto Show. Opel developed the battery control modules for the Ampera at the Opel Alternative Propulsion Center Europe in Mainz-Kastel, Germany. The production version of the Ampera was unveiled at the 2011 Geneva Motor Show. The Ampera was assembled at the Detroit/Hamtramck Assembly plant, Michigan.

The main differences between the Volt and the Ampera are in their styling. The Ampera has a distinctive front and rear fascia, with a large cut-out in the rear bumper. The Opel Ampera features more stylized alloy wheels as standard, and the side skirts are body-colored rather than black. In the inside there are only minor differences and both versions share the same exact powertrain and battery pack. A key operational difference was that the Ampera has four drive modes, one more than the 2011/12 model year Volt. The additional option is City Mode, which adapts battery management to the needs of commuter travel. City mode or "battery hold" engages the range-extender immediately, allowing to save the energy currently stored in the battery, and when switched off, the range-extender stops and the Ampera is then able to use the energy saved in the battery for pure electric driving, for example for traveling urban areas or restricted zones, such as the European low emission zones or to allow the Ampera to qualify for an exemption of the London congestion charge The 2013 model year Volt included the "Hold Drive" button to allow drivers to conserve battery-pack energy for use at a particular time of their choice.

Sales
General Motors production target for 2012 was to manufacture 10,000 Amperas for sale in Europe, 6,000 destined for Opel and 4,000 for Vauxhall in the UK, plus an additional 2,000 Volts were to be made available for the region. The carmaker targeted the Ampera for business fleet market and local government agencies, where Opel has a strong customer base, while the Volt is aimed at retail customers. According to Opel, by June 2011 around 5,000 customers across Europe had reserved an Ampera, with fleet or business customers representing 60% of reservations, and a total of 7,000 orders were received by March 2012, with Benelux, Germany, and the United Kingdom as the top markets in terms of orders.

The first deliveries of the Chevrolet Volt in Europe took place on November 30, 2011, to the U.S. Embassy in France. Distribution of the Opel Ampera to dealerships began in December 2011, but deliveries to customers were delayed until February 2012 because Opel decided to wait until the NHTSA completed its investigation of the Volt's battery fire risk after a crash. Since May 2012 the Vauxhall Ampera is available through the Zipcar carsharing club in London, Bristol, Cambridge, and Oxford.

The Opel/Vauxhall Ampera was Europe's top selling plug-in electric car in 2012 with 5,268 units and captured a 21.5% market share of the region's plug-in electric passenger car segment. , the Ampera held a market share of almost 10% of European registration of plug-in electric cars since 2011. The market share in the Netherlands was 40% and 10% in Germany. Ampera sales fell 40% in 2013 to 3,184 cars, and within the plug-in hybrid segment, the Ampera was surpassed in 2013 by the Mitsubishi Outlander P-HEV (8,197), Volvo V60 plug-in (7,437), and the Prius plug-in (4,314). In 2013 the Ampera ranked eighth among Europe's top selling plug-in electric vehicles, and its market share fell to about 5%. During the first five months of 2014, only 332 units had been sold, down 67% from the same period in 2013. In July 2014, Opel announced that due to the slowdown in sales, they would discontinue the Ampera after the second generation Volt launch—and that between 2014 and 2018, they plan to introduce a successor electric vehicle in Europe. Ampera sales totaled 939 units in 2014, and only 215 units during the first nine months of 2015.

, Opel/Vauxhall Ampera sales totaled just over 10,000 units since 2011, with the Netherlands as the leading market with 5,031 Amperas registered, followed by Germany with 1,542 units, and the UK with 1,250 units registered by the end of June 2015. The Netherlands is also the top selling Volt market in Europe with 1,062 units registered through December 2014, out of about 1,750 Volts sold through 2014.

Pricing
In February 2011 Opel announced they would offer the Ampera throughout the Eurozone for a uniform , including VAT. Prices by country still varied due to different trim levels in each market. The Opel Ampera is eligible to several subsidies and tax breaks available for plug-in electric vehicles in several European countries.

All Volts in the UK came standard with leather interior.

China
General Motors unveiled the Chevrolet Volt in Shanghai under its Chinese name of 沃蓝达 (Wo Lan Da) in September 2010. The first Volts, out of the 10-vehicle demonstration fleet, arrived in China by late December 2011. The demonstration program is taking place in Beijing, Tianjin and Shanghai.

GM explained that 13 dealerships were selected in the eight cities, and they were chosen because these "cities have more elites who are inclined to try new technologies and lead the fashion tide."

General Motors negotiated with the Chinese government to let the Volt qualify for the subsidies without the technology transfer, but , the subsidies were available only for electric cars made by Chinese automakers. As a result of the high import duties, General Motors reported in August 2012 that sales are minimal, those of a very low-volume car. According to LMC Automotive, a total of 18 Volts have been sold in China through June 2012.

In March 2012, General Motors announced that an agreement was signed with the China Automotive Technology and Research Center (CATARC) to manage the Volt demonstration fleet in Beijing and to gather feedback from the fleet usage for one year. The demonstration Volts were scheduled to be delivered in April 2012.

The Buick Velite 5 was introduced at the 2017 Shanghai Auto Show, a rebadged second generation Chevrolet Volt tailored for the Chinese market. The Velite 5 was manufactured in China.

Other markets 
Australia

Deliveries of the Holden Volt in the Australian market began in December 2012, and the first Volt was delivered to the U.S. Ambassador in Canberra. In November 2011 the first Holden Volt arrived in Australia for a series of evaluation tests. Holden stated that the Volt underwent numerous modifications to better suit it to Australian roads, though the test vehicles were still left-hand drive.

The Holden Volt was available through 49 select Holden dealerships throughout metropolitan and rural Australia, with 18 in Victoria, 11 in New South Wales, 9 in Queensland, 7 in Western Australia and 4 in South Australia. A total of 80 Holden Volts were sold during 2012, and 101 units in 2013. A total of 246 had been sold in the country by mid April 2015, with the stock of the first generation almost empty. General Motors announced that it would not build the second generation Volt in right-hand-drive configuration, so the Volt was discontinued in Australia when the remaining stock sold out.

Brazil
General Motors do Brasil announced that it would import from five to ten Volts to Brazil during the first semester of 2011 as part of a demonstration and also to lobby the federal government to enact financial incentives for green cars. If successful, General Motors would adapt the Volt to operate on ethanol fuel, as most new Brazilian cars are flex-fuel.

Japan
In December 2010, General Motors announced plans to introduce the Volt in limited numbers into Japan in 2011 for technology and market test purposes. Exports for retail sales will depend on the results of this trial.

Mexico
The second generation Volt was released for retail customers in December 2015. Pricing starts at 638,000 pesos (~), and it is available in Mexico City, Monterrey, Guadalajara, Querétaro, and Puebla. Sales totaled 36 units and in 2017 and 34 in 2018.

New Zealand
The Holden Volt was released in New Zealand through three dealerships, with one in Auckland, Christchurch and Wellington. Due to low sales of the first generation model, the second generation Volt was not available in New Zealand.

Global sales
Combined global Volt/Ampera sales passed the 100,000 unit milestone in October 2015.  The Volt/Ampera family was the world's best selling plug-in electric car in 2012 with 31,400 units sold. The Opel/Vauxhall Ampera was Europe's top selling plug-in electric car in 2012 with 5,268 units, representing a market share of 21.5% of the region's plug-in electric passenger car segment. However, during 2013 Ampera sales fell 40%, and the declining trend continued during 2014 and 2015.

, global Volt/Ampera family sales totaled about 177,000 units since its inception in December 2010, including over 10,000 Opel/Vauxhall Amperas sold in Europe up to December 2015. Until the end of 2018, the Volt/Ampera family of vehicles listed as the world's all-time top-selling plug-in hybrid, when it was surpassed by the Mitsubishi Outlander P-HEV (200,000 units by March 2019).

, Chevrolet Volt sales are led by the United States with 157,054 units delivered, followed by Canada with 16,653 units through September 2018, and the Netherlands with 1,062 Volts registered through December 2015. Out of the 9,989 Opel/Vauxhall Amperas sold in Europe through December 2015, 5,031 were registered in the Netherlands, 1,542 in Germany, and 1,279 in the UK by the end of September 2015, together representing 78% of Ampera sales.

The following tables present retail sales of the Volt and Ampera variants through December 2015 for the top-selling national markets by year since deliveries began in December 2010. Demonstration vehicles allocated to dealerships are not included in retail sales reports while they are used for test drives.

End of production
In 2018, General Motors decided to end production in March 2019. The primary reason given was that the Volt is a sedan, and sales of traditional sedans were in decline. Car salesmen were proving resistant to selling the car because it was more complicated (and thus took more of their time) to explain how the vehicle operated. Marketing trends showed that sales of hybrids were dropping as more customers were turning to all-electric vehicles like the Chevrolet Bolt. The range-anxiety associated with all-electric vehicles had been in decline due to better battery technology, and most hybrid drivers were turning on their gas-powered engines less frequently. The battery technology developed for the Volt had already been incorporated into the Bolt.

Related concept cars 

Cadillac Converj

The Cadillac Converj is a plug-in hybrid concept car first unveiled at the 2009 North American International Auto Show. It incorporated the propulsion system from the Chevrolet Volt, including the Voltec powertrain. In August 2011, General Motors announced it would produce the Converj as the Cadillac ELR. The first 2014 ELRs rolled off the production line in late May 2013. These were pre-production units destined for testing purposes and production for retail customers started at the end of 2013. The ELR was released to retail customers in the U.S. in December 2013.

Volt MPV5
At the 2010 Auto China show General Motors unveiled the Chevrolet Volt MPV5 Concept. The MPV5 integrates design elements from the Volt, with a body style very similar to the Chevrolet Orlando and four inches larger than its predecessor, Chevrolet HHR.

Opel Monza Concept
The Opel Monza Concept is a four-seat coupe plug-in hybrid concept car with gullwing door unveiled at the 2013 Frankfurt Motor Show. The concept shares the same basic plug-in hybrid setup as the Chevrolet Volt and Opel Ampera, but using a turbocharged 1 L 3-cylinder natural gas-powered engine as its range extender instead of General Motors’ current 1.4 L gasoline engine. According to Opel, this concept is the role model for the next generation of Opel cars, and because of its modular chassis design, future cars based on it would be able to accommodate gasoline, diesel or electric power.

Controversies and criticism

EPA fuel economy testing 

In 2008, General Motors was concerned about how the United States Environmental Protection Agency (EPA) would test the Volt to determine its official fuel economy rating. The controversy centered on whether, by including a gasoline engine, the Volt should be classified as a hybrid rather than an electric car as claimed by General Motors. If tested with the same EPA tests used by other hybrids, the Volt's EPA fuel economy rating would be around  due to the current EPA test for hybrids disallowing vehicles from boosting their mpg rating using stored battery power. General Motors stated that the Volt is an entirely new type of vehicle that the EPA's current fuel economy tests are not suited to rate and that a new test should be devised for this emerging class of hybrid-electrics. General Motors also advocated for a more simplified mpg calculation method to take into account the range of a plug-in hybrid while running solely on electricity. Because the Volt can travel  on batteries alone, GM argued that most drivers with a daily commute of less than that distance would drive only in electric mode, so long as they recharged their vehicle at work or at home overnight.

The EPA official rating issued in November 2010 included separate fuel economy ratings for all-electric mode and gasoline-only mode, with an overall combined city/highway gasoline-electricity fuel economy rating of  equivalent (MPG-e). To address the variability of the fuel economy outcome depending on miles driven between charges, EPA also included in the Volt's fuel economy label a table showing fuel economy and electricity consumed for five different scenarios driven between a full charge, and a never-charge scenario. According to this table the Volt's fuel economy goes up to  equivalent (MPG-e) if driven  between full charges. Also, in recognition of the multiple operating modes that a plug-in hybrid can be built with (all-electric, blended, and gasoline-only), for the new fuel economy and environment label that will be mandatory in the U.S. beginning in model year 2013, EPA and the National Highway Traffic Safety Administration (NHTSA) issued two separate fuel economy labels for plug-in hybrids. One label is for extended-range electric vehicles, like the Chevy Volt, with two modes: all-electric and gasoline-only; and a second label for blended mode that includes a combination of all-electric, gasoline and electric operation, and gasoline only, like a conventional hybrid vehicle.

EPA fuel economy rating 
The U.S. Environmental Protection Agency (EPA) issued a statement clarifying that the "EPA has not tested a Chevy Volt and therefore cannot confirm the fuel economy values claimed by GM." In July 2010, GM explained that their estimate was based on a formula that had not been officially approved and that they had been awaiting the EPA's decision on how the equivalent fuel economy of plug-in hybrids would be estimated.

The official EPA rating was issued in November 2010 and became the agency's first fuel economy label for a plug-in hybrids.

Production cost and sales price 
In 2009, the Presidential Task Force on the Auto Industry said that "GM is at least one generation behind Toyota on advanced, "green" powertrain development. In an attempt to leapfrog Toyota, GM has devoted significant resources to the Chevy Volt" and that "while the Chevy Volt holds promise, it is currently projected to be much more expensive than its gasoline-fueled peers and will likely need substantial reductions in manufacturing cost in order to become commercially viable."
A 2009 Carnegie Mellon University study found that a PHEV-40 will be less cost effective than a HEV or a PHEV-7 in all of the scenarios considered, due to the cost and weight of the battery.

In early 2010, it was reported that General Motors would lose money on the Volt for at least the first couple of generations, but it hoped the car would create a green image that could rival the Prius.

General Motors CEO Edward Whitacre Jr. rejected as "ridiculous" criticism that the Volt's price is too expensive. He said that "I think it's a very fair price. It's the only car that will go coast to coast on electricity without plugging it in, and nobody else can come close." Despite the federal government being the major GM shareholder due to the 2009 government-led bankruptcy of the automaker, during a press briefing at the White House a Treasury official clarified that the federal government did not have any input on the pricing of the 2011 Chevrolet Volt.

Even though the carmaker cannot dictate vehicle pricing to its dealers, GM said that it had requested its dealers to keep prices in line with the company's suggested retail price.

In May 2011 the National Legal and Policy Center announced that some Chevrolet dealers were selling Volts to other dealers and claiming the  federal tax credit for themselves. Then the dealers who bought the Volts sell them as used cars with low mileage to private buyers, who no longer qualify for the credit. General Motors acknowledged that 10 dealer-to-dealer Volt sales had taken place among Chevrolet dealers, but the carmaker said they do not encourage such practice.

In September 2012, Reuters published an opinion/editorial article where it claimed that General Motors, nearly two years after the introduction of the car, was losing  on each Volt it built. The article concluded that the Volt is "over-engineered and over-priced" and that its technological complexity has put off many prospective buyers, due to fears the car may be unreliable. GM executives replied that Reuters' estimates were significantly flawed as they also allocated the vehicle's research and development program costs only against the number of Volts sold in the United States, instead of spreading the total costs over the entire lifetime of the model, as well as including those units sold in Europe and other countries. GM explained that the investments will pay off once the innovative technologies of the Volt are applied across multiple current and future products.

Battery pack fire risk 

In June 2011 a Volt that had been subjected by the National Highway Traffic Safety Administration (NHTSA) to a  side pole impact crash test followed by a post-impact rollover, caught fire three weeks later in the test center parking lot, burning nearby vehicles. The battery was found to be the source of the fire. After the fire, both Chevrolet and the NHTSA independently replicated the crash test and a subsequent vehicle rotation procedure to test for any fluid leakage, but in their first attempt they could not reproduce the conditions under which the battery pack ignited. The NHTSA said it had "concluded that the crash test damaged the Volt's lithium-ion battery and that the damage led to a vehicle fire that took several weeks to develop." In further testing of the Volt's batteries carried out by NHTSA in November 2011, two of the three tests resulted in thermal events. One battery pack was rotated 180 degrees within hours after it was impacted and began to smoke and emit sparks after rotation. In the other case, the battery pack that was crashed-tested one week earlier and that had been monitored since the test caught fire. The NHTSA then took an uncommon step on November 25, 2011, and opened a formal safety defect investigation "without any data from real-world incidents" to examine the potential risks involved from intrusion damage to the battery pack in the Chevrolet Volt. After the initial Volt fire, the NHTSA examined the Nissan Leaf and other plug-in electric vehicles and said its testing "has not raised safety concerns about vehicles other than the Chevy Volt."

As a result of this investigation, GM announced that it would offer any new GM car in exchange to any Volt owner who has concerns while the federal investigation was taking place. In December 2011, the company said that if necessary they were prepared to recall all the vehicles and repair them upon determination of the cause of the fires, and also announced they would buy back the car if the owner was too afraid of the potential for a fire. GM's CEO also said that it may be necessary to redesign or make changes to the battery pack depending on the recommendations from federal officials. As of 1, 33 December Volt owners in the U.S. and 3 in Canada had requested a loaner car. As of December 5, General Motors reported that a couple dozen Volt owners had requested the carmaker to buy back their cars, and the company had already agreed to repurchase about a dozen. Before the carmaker agrees to buy back each vehicle, other options are explored as GM primarily wants to provide loaner cars, but "if the only way we can make them happy is to repurchase it, then we will," a GM spokesman said. General Motors explained that the buy back price includes the Volt purchase price, plus taxes and fees, less a usage fee based on how many miles the car has been run. As of January 5, 2012, GM reported that around 250 Volt owners had requested either a loaner vehicle or a potential buyback.

The NHTSA also said it was working with all automakers to develop postcrash procedures to keep occupants of electric vehicles and emergency personnel who respond to crash scenes safe. Additionally, NHTSA advised to be aware that fires may occur a considerable amount of time after a crash. General Motors said the first fire would have been avoided if GM's protocols for deactivating the battery after the crash had been followed. These protocols had been used by GM since July 2011 but were not shared with the NHTSA until November 2011. In another statement the carmaker stated that they "are working with other vehicle manufacturers, first responders, tow truck operators, and salvage associations with the goal of implementing industrywide protocols."

Customer deliveries of the Opel Ampera in Europe were delayed until the NHTSA completed its investigation of the Volt's battery fire risk to make sure the vehicle is safe. However, deliveries of the first Chevrolet Volts in Europe began in France in November 2011. Deliveries of the Vauxhall Ampera in the UK continued as scheduled for May 2012. Opel Ampera deliveries began in February 2012.

Battery enhancements
On January 5, 2012, General Motors announced that it would offer a customer-satisfaction program to provide modifications to the Chevrolet Volt to reduce the chance that the battery pack could catch fire days or weeks after a severe accident. The carmaker described the modifications as voluntary enhancements and stated that neither the car nor the battery was being recalled. General Motors determined the June fire was the result of a minor intrusion from a portion of the vehicle into a side section of the battery pack. When the vehicle was put through a slow roll, where it was rotated at 90-degree increments, holding in each position for about five minutes, an additional  of coolant leaked. With the vehicle in the 180 degrees position (upside down), the coolant came in contact with the printed circuit board electronics at the top of the battery pack and later crystallized. Three weeks later this condition, in combination with a charged battery, led to a short circuit that resulted in the post-crash fire.

General Motors explained the modifications will enhance the vehicle structure that surround the battery and the battery coolant system to improve battery protection after a severe crash. The safety enhancements consist of strengthening an existing portion of the Volt's vehicle safety structure to further protect the battery pack in a severe side collision; add a sensor in the reservoir of the battery coolant system to monitor coolant levels; and add a tamper-resistant bracket to the top of the battery coolant reservoir to help prevent potential coolant overfill.

During December 2011, GM conducted four crash tests of Volts with the reinforced steel and upgraded cooling system, resulting in no intrusion to the battery and no coolant leakage. On December 22, 2011, the NHTSA also subjected a modified Volt to the same test that led to the original fire, with no signs of the damage that is believed to have been the cause. The NHTSA said "the preliminary results of the crash test indicate the remedy proposed by General Motors today should address the issue of battery intrusion" though its investigation remained open. General Motors declined to say how much the modifications would cost.

All 12,400 Chevrolet Volts produced until December 2011, including all Amperas in stock at European dealerships, were scheduled to receive the safety enhancements. Since production was halted during the holidays, the enhancements were in place when production resumed in early 2012. Sales continued, and dealers modified the Volts they had in stock. General Motors sent a letter to Volt owners indicating that they could schedule the service appointment to protect their batteries beginning in the last week of March 2012. General Motors also decided to replace the 120-volt charging cords in most of the nearly 10,000 Volts sold since late 2010. The new cords were enhanced to add durability, and some of the chargers built after February 5 have the new cords.

NHTSA findings
On January 20, 2012, the National Highway Traffic Safety Administration closed the Volt's safety defect investigation related to post-crash fire risk. The agency concluded that "no discernible defect trend exists" and also found that the modifications recently developed by General Motors are sufficient to reduce the potential for battery intrusion resulting from side impacts. The NHTSA also said that "based on the available data, NHTSA does not believe that Chevy Volts or other electric vehicles pose a greater risk of fire than gasoline-powered vehicles." The agency also announced it has developed interim guidance to increase awareness and identify appropriate safety measures regarding electric vehicles for the emergency response community, law enforcement officers, tow truck operators, storage facilities and consumers.

House of Representatives hearing
The chairman of the Subcommittee on Regulatory Affairs, Stimulus Oversight and Government Spending, U.S. Representative Jim Jordan held hearings on January 25, 2012, to investigate why the NHTSA opened a formal investigation only five months after the first postcrash battery fire occurred in June. The subcommittee of the House Committee on Oversight and Government Reform wanted to determine if government officials, including from NHTSA, purposely held back information on the Volt fire for political reasons. Both Daniel Akerson, General Motors CEO, and David L. Strickland, NHTSA administrator, denied any wrongdoing.

Reception

Awards and recognition 
The Volt has received awards from multiple organizations:

U.S. organizations
 2009 Green Car Vision Award by the Green Car Journal at the Washington Auto Show for "a bold and far-reaching approach that promises to bring an exceptionally fuel efficient model to consumers at reasonable cost."
 2011 Car and Driver Ten Best Cars. For the first time ever Car and Driver magazine included an electrically powered car among its 10 best.

 2011 Motor Trend Car of the Year. The magazine commented that "In the 61-year history of the Car of the Year award, there have been few contenders as hyped – or as controversial – as the Chevrolet Volt."
 2011 Green Car of the Year by Green Car Journal. The magazine editors explained that "This award welcomes a new genre of mass-production electric vehicles to the consumer market, with the Volt as the first-ever electric vehicle to take top prize."
 2011 Automobile of the Year by Automobile Magazine. The editors commented that the Volt "...is genuinely an all-new car, in the most simplistic sense as well as in the greater notion that the Volt is unlike any vehicle we have ever driven."
 2011 North American Car of the Year announced at the 2011 North American International Auto Show. Forty-nine American and Canadian automobile writers chose the Volt. The nominees were judged based on "innovation, design, safety, handling, driver satisfaction and value".
 Listed among the 2011 Greenest Vehicles of the Year by the American Council for an Energy-Efficient Economy.
 Listed among the 2011 Best Green Cars by Mother Earth News.
 2011 Edison Award – Gold in the Transportation Category, Personal Transportation Segment.
 2012 Best Resale Value Award in the category of electric cars by Kelley Blue Book.
 2011 The Volt ranked first in Consumer Reports' list of owner-satisfaction based on its 2011 Annual Auto Survey, with 93% respondents who owned the Volt saying they definitely would purchase that same vehicle again. The magazine noted that the Volt had been on sale for just a few months at the time of the survey, and also clarified that the survey took place before the National Highway Traffic Safety Administration investigation regarding the Volt's battery fire risk.
 2012 Total Cost of Ownership Award in the electric car category, granted by Kelley Blue Book for the lowest projected costs during the initial five-year ownership period in its category.
 2012 The Volt ranked first, for the second year in a row, in Consumer Reports' list of owner-satisfaction based on its 2012 Annual Auto Survey, with 92% respondents who owned the Volt saying they definitely would purchase that same vehicle again.
 2016 Green Car of the Year by Green Car Journal (awarded to the second generation Volt). The Chevrolet Volt is the first model to receive this award more than once.

International organizations

 2009 Festival Automobile International awarded the Grand Prize for Environment to the Volt.
 2011 World Green Car announced at the 2011 New York Auto Show.
 2012 International Engine of the Year Award in the category of Green Engine, shared by the Opel Ampera and the Chevrolet Volt for their 1.4 L engine-based extended-range electric powertrain.

European organizations
 2011 Overall Winner of What Car? Green Awards, granted by the UK magazine to the Vauxhall Ampera.
 2011 Top Gear's "Green Car of the Year 2011" to the Vauxhall Ampera.
 2012 Car of the Year in Denmark. In October 2011, 18 Danish motor journalists chose the Opel Ampera as "Car of the Year 2012" by a wide margin, despite being more expensive than the family cars the award usually goes to.
 2012 European Car of the Year, shared by the Chevrolet Volt and the Opel/Vauxhall. The Ampera/Volt became the first car developed in the U.S. to win this European award.
 2013 Green Mobility Trophy. Readers of Auto Zeitung in Germany awarded the Opel Ampera the trophy and named the mid-size sedan the best electric vehicle.

Rest of the world organizations
 2012 Drive's Green Innovation Award to the Holden Volt, as part of the Australia's Drive Car of the Year Awards.

See also 

 Cadillac ELR
 Chevrolet Spark EV
 Chevrolet Bolt
 EV Project
 General Motors EV1 – all-electric car from the 1990s
 General Motors XP-883 – plug-in hybrid from 1969
 General Motors Hy-wire – hydrogen powered
 General Motors Sequel – hydrogen powered
 Genset trailer
 Government incentives for plug-in electric vehicles
 List of bestselling automobiles
 List of modern production plug-in electric vehicles
 Magna International
 Opel Flextreme – Diesel plug-in hybrid by Opel
 Revenge of the Electric Car

References

External links 

 Official website (archived)
 BMW i3 REx vs. Chevrolet Volt: two different approaches to plug-in hybrids, Torque News, June 2014
 Chevrolet Volt electric range variability for different ambient temperatures
 Complete list of Chevrolet Volt awards
 NHTSA Interim Safety Guidance for Vehicle Owner/General Public
 NHTSA Interim Safety Guidance for Law Enforcement/Emergency Medical Services/Fire Department
 NHTSA Chevrolet Volt Battery Incident Report Overview, January 2012 – DOT HS 811 573
 NFPA Chevrolet Volt Emergency Response Guide
 Volt Owner User Community

Volt
Plug-in hybrid vehicles
Flexible-fuel vehicles
Front-wheel-drive vehicles
Vehicles with CVT transmission
Partial zero-emissions vehicles
Cars introduced in 2010
Compact cars
Hatchbacks
Euro NCAP small family cars
Volt